The 1836 United States presidential election in Maine took place between November 3 and December 7, 1836, as part of the 1836 United States presidential election. Voters chose ten representatives, or electors to the Electoral College, who voted for President and Vice President.

Maine voted for the Democratic candidate, Martin Van Buren, over Whig candidate William Henry Harrison. Van Buren won the state by a margin of 20.71%.

Van Buren would be the final Democratic presidential candidate until Lyndon B. Johnson in 1964 to carry Somerset County.

Results

See also
 United States presidential elections in Maine

References

Maine
1836
1836 Maine elections